Alchemy (formerly Millennium Entertainment) was an American independent global film distributor based in Los Angeles, California. The company acquired and distributed feature films, television series and specialty programming.

History
Millennium Entertainment was 60% owned by production company Nu Image. Exclusive Media Group owned 20% and Prentice Capital owned the remaining stock. Following its formation in 2010, the company marked its first noteworthy theatrical release  in 2011 with Trust, starring Academy Award nominees  Clive Owen, Catherine Keener, and Viola Davis. Alchemy owns and operates a film library consisting of over 1,000 titles, including Paris, Je’TAime, Transsiberian, and  Bad Lieutenant: Port of Call New Orleans, as well as the recent titles Elephant White, starring Djimon Hounsou and Kevin Bacon; Shadows and Lies, starring James Franco; and Blitz, starring Jason Statham.

Television series released by Alchemy include The Cosby Show, Baywatch, and A Different World. First Look Studios originally released all eight seasons of The Cosby Show, A Different World, and other shows on DVD, but they eventually filed bankruptcy in 2010.  Millennium Entertainment acquired all of First Look Studios’ assets, and continued to release them in the United States, Canada, Bermuda, and other U.S. Territories. In April 2013, it was announced that Millennium Entertainment would be sold, and an investment company, Salem Partners, would assist in the sale. In August 2014 the company's library and distribution assets had been sold to a consortium consisting of its current management and Virgo Investment Group. The new owners renamed the company Alchemy in January 2015, finally cutting ties to its former sister company Millennium Films.

In July 2015 Alchemy acquired the film distribution assets of ANconnect and the digital film and television distributor Anderson Digital, both divisions of Anderson Media Corporation. The transaction will result in the addition of 40 new employees to the existent 70 and expand the company's catalogue to over 1,300 films and 3,000 TV episodes. In December 2015 Bill Lee exited the company as CEO.

Bankruptcy
In February 2016 Alchemy laid off 40 employees, equaling 40% of the company's entire staff.  due to liquidity issues. The company began selling off previously acquired films including The Lobster, Free Fire, Mia Madre, 31 and Evolution. The Lobster and Free Fire were purchased by A24, while Madre was sold to Music Box Films, 31 to Saban Films and Evolution to IFC Midnight. The last of their acquisitions, Zeroville, wasn't released until 2019.

Alchemy filed for Chapter 7 bankruptcy on June 30, 2016. All employees were released following the bankruptcy.

Releases

TV series
 Bethenny Ever After
 Baywatch
 The Cosby Show
 A Different World
 Flipping Out
 Guy's Big Bite
 Hell's Kitchen
 The Invisible Man
 Kathy Griffin: My Life on the D-List
 McMillan & Wife
 Million Dollar Listing Los Angeles
 The Millionaire Matchmaker
 Pregnant In Heels
 The Rachel Zoe Project
 Tabatha Takes Over
 Unsolved Mysteries

Animated
 Arthur! and the Square Knights of the Round Table
 Dinky Dog
 Drak Pack
 Khumba
 Wing Commander Academy

Films

 Alpha Males Experiment
 The Babymakers
 Bernie
 Blitz
 Buck Wild
 Control
 Dead Awake
 Dead Sushi
 The Elephant in the Living Room
 Elephant White
 Elsa & Fred
 Faces in the Crowd
 Fake
 High Road
 Hisss
 The Iceman 
 Intruders
 Laddaland
 Life of a King
 Linklater
 The Liquidator
 Little Birds
 A Little Bit of Heaven
 Love
 Moonwalkers
 The Nocturnal
 Persecuted 
 Playing Dirty                                    
 Puncture
 Rampart
 Red Lights
 Rob the Mob     
 The Runner
 Sacrifice
 Shadows and Lies
 Skin Traffik
 So Undercover
 Spiders
 Stolen
 Straight A's
 Strangerland
 Stuck in Love
 Survivor
 The Taking of Deborah Logan
 Trespass
 Trust
 The Ultimate Yogi
 Upside Down
 The Wedding Weekend
 Welcome to Me
 What Maisie Knew
 It's Alive

Distributed lines
 UFC Ultimate Fighting Championship
 Video Asia

References

External links
Official Alchemy LLC website
YouTube.com: Millennium Entertainment channel

Film distributors of the United States
Home video companies of the United States
Defunct film and television production companies of the United States
Entertainment companies based in California
Companies based in Los Angeles
Entertainment companies established in 2010
Mass media companies established in 2010
Mass media companies disestablished in 2016
2010 establishments in California
2016 disestablishments in California
Companies that have filed for Chapter 7 bankruptcy
Privately held companies based in California
Defunct companies based in Greater Los Angeles